Antonin Koutouan Nantcho, better known as Tony (born 11 November 1983) is an Ivorian former professional footballer who played as a forward.

Club career
Born in Abidjan, Ivory Coast, Koutouan began his career at the ASEC Abidjan youth academy, before moving to Belgian club K.S.K. Beveren. He also played for FC Lorient and Grenoble Foot 38 in France.

References

External links
 FIFA World Youth Championships 2003 – Ivory Coast Squad Profile
 Ivory Coast Youth Team – “Tremendous potential going forward”

1983 births
Living people
Ivorian footballers
Footballers from Abidjan
Association football forwards
Ivory Coast international footballers
Ivory Coast under-20 international footballers
Ligue 1 players
UAE Pro League players
Ligue 1 (Ivory Coast) players
ASEC Mimosas players
K.S.K. Beveren players
Al Wahda FC players
FC Lorient players
Grenoble Foot 38 players
Al Jazira Club players
Al-Arabi SC (Qatar) players
Baniyas Club players
Ivorian expatriate footballers
Ivorian expatriate sportspeople in Belgium
Expatriate footballers in Belgium
Ivorian expatriate sportspeople in France
Expatriate footballers in France
Ivorian expatriate sportspeople in the United Arab Emirates
Expatriate footballers in the United Arab Emirates